Hypericum kiboense is a flowering plant the family Hypericaceae,  section Adenosepalum, subsection Adenosepalum.

Description
The species is a shrub that grows to be 2.5 m tall with orange or red stems. Its flowers are golden and tinged red and are 15–20 mm in diameter.

Distribution
Hypericum kiboense is found in Uganda, Kenya, (including the forests of Cherangani hills,) and North Tanzania

References

kiboense
Flora of Kenya
Flora of Tanzania
Flora of Uganda
Taxa named by Daniel Oliver